The Southern California Lacrosse League (SCMLL) is a senior/post-collegiate men's field lacrosse league based in Southern California. Clubs annually compete for the league championship in the Spring.

Teams in the SCLAX 
South Division
 Rays Lacrosse Club
 Los Banditos
 San Diego Lacrosse Club
 40 Thieves
 OMBAC Beachcombers
North Division
 West Express LC
 Venice Lacrosse Club
 Beverly Hills LC
 Malibu Lacrosse Club

Champions
 2013: Quicksilver LC
 2014: South Bay LC
 2019: San Diego Lacrosse Club

References

External links
 

Lacrosse leagues in the United States
1990s establishments in California